Makerfield is an area in North West England. It is now split between the Metropolitan Borough of Wigan in Greater Manchester, and the Metropolitan Borough of St Helens in Merseyside, both within the historic county boundaries of Lancashire.

Places in the area include Ince-in-Makerfield, Ashton-in-Makerfield and Newton-in-Makerfield. The Domesday survey recorded an area of woodland in excess of 10 leagues by 6 leagues associated with Newton. This was larger by far than anywhere else in the Cheshire survey. An area of this size would have encompassed most of the land bordered by present-day Warrington, Wigan, and Leigh townships. When Makerfield was referred to it could have been anywhere within this woodland area.

UK Parliament
The western part of Wigan borough constitutes the Makerfield parliamentary constituency.

Etymology
The name Makerfield may be the same place as Maserfelth recorded by Bede, the site of a battle in 642 AD at which King Penda of Mercia defeated and killed King Oswald of Northumbria. The name may derive from Brittonic *magẹ:r , meaning "a wall" (adopted from Latin māceria > Welsh magwyr, Breton moger; compare Magor, Wales). In the Latin of Bede's time, there was no "K". He would have spelt it Macerfelth, which may easily have been corrupted to Maserfelth.

References

Areas of Greater Manchester
Geography of the Metropolitan Borough of Wigan